The Church of St Margaret the Queen is a grade I listed building in Buxted Park, East Sussex, England. It is dedicated to Saint Margaret of Scotland, an 11th-century Scottish queen. The church dates from the 13th century, with additions in the 15th and 16th centuries and restored in 1858. In the present day, it is a middle-of-the-road Church of England church and part of the Parish of Buxted and Hadlow Down in the diocese of Chichester.

Gallery

See also
Grade I listed buildings in East Sussex
List of current places of worship in Wealden

References

Grade I listed churches in East Sussex
13th-century church buildings in England
Church of England church buildings in East Sussex
Margaret